The Ibn Khaldun International Institute of Advanced Research (abbreviated ISLAH; formerly known as International Institute of Islamic Thought and Civilisation) is a research and postgraduate institution of the International Islamic University Malaysia (IIUM) located at Pesiaran Tuanku Syed Sirajuddin off Jalan Duta, Kuala Lumpur, Malaysia.

ISLAH  was changed from its former name, the International Institute of Islamic Thought and Civilisations (ISTAC) for a very short time (within less than 6 months since its inception in 2015). The change of name to ISLAH was a political move to save ISTAC by several former academics when it was instructed to be relocated and restructured. But the inception did not last long and later, all the programmes based at ISLAH were merged with IRKHS courses, and its professors and students relocated to International Islamic University Malaysia main campus in Gombak.

The compound where the 'beacon at the crest of a hill' once stands, is managed by then, the Centre for Strategic Continuing Education and Training (CRESCENT) until 2017 when it changed its ownership to the International Institute of Islamic Civilisation and the Malay World (Malay World, later on asked to remain the old name ISTAC by the Deputy Prime Minister of Malaysia, Zahid Hamidi).

See also
 Islamisation of knowledge

References 

 Waardenburg, Jacques. "Observations on the Scholarly Study of Religions as Pursued in Some Muslim Countries", Numen, Vol. 45, No. 3. (1998), pp. 237. Jstor.org

External links 
 Syed Muhammad Naquib al-Attas Library 

Research institutes in Malaysia
Universities and colleges in Selangor
Islamic universities and colleges in Malaysia
International Islamic University Malaysia
Educational institutions established in 1987
1987 establishments in Malaysia